Jürgen Kirschner (born April 18, 1945) is a German solid state physicist and a director at the Max Planck Institute of Microstructure Physics. Kirschner is known for his research in electron spectroscopy, including instrument development and the study of magnetic materials.

Education and career 
Kirschner was born in Arendsee (Altmark) and studied physics at Technical University of Munich, where he obtained his PhD in 1974. He followed with research position at Forschungszentrum Jülich and obtained his habilitation at RWTH Aachen University in 1982. From 1988 to 1991, he was a professor in experimental physics at the Free University of Berlin. From 1992 to 2015, he was at the Max Planck Institute of Microstructure Physics in Halle, where he also became a professor at the University of Halle since 1993. He retired in 2015.

Honors and awards 
Kirschner is a member of the German National Academy of Sciences Leopoldina since 2002. He has led several programs from the German Research Foundation.

Bibliography

References 

1945 births
People from Altmarkkreis Salzwedel
Technical University of Munich alumni
Academic staff of RWTH Aachen University
Academic staff of the Free University of Berlin
Academic staff of the University of Halle
Max Planck Institute directors
Max Planck Society people
German physicists
Experimental physicists
Condensed matter physicists
German materials scientists
Members of the German Academy of Sciences Leopoldina
Living people